Gazvar-e Sofla (also Romanized as Gazvar-e Soflá and Gazūr-e Soflá; also known as Gazvar, Kazvar, Kazvaz-e Soflá, Kazwar, and Kyazvar) is a village in Sanjabad-e Shomali Rural District, in the Central District of Kowsar County, Ardabil Province, Iran. At the 2006 census, its population was 80, in 14 families.

References 

Tageo

Towns and villages in Kowsar County